The Dullay languages belong to the Cushitic subgroup of the Afro-Asiatic language family and are spoken in Ethiopia. Dullay is a dialect continuum consisting of the Gawwada and Tsamai languages. Blench (2006) places most of Bussa in the Konsoid languages, and counts several Gawwada varieties as distinct languages.

Gawwada, Tsamai, Dihina, Dobase (Lohu, Mashole), Gergere, Gollango (Gaba?), Gorrose, Harso

The name Dullay is derived from the name Dullay-speaking groups use for the Weito River. Other terms that have been used for this language family in scientific literature are Werizoid (from the former administrative name of the area inhabited by Dullay speakers) and Qawko (from the word "man" in Dullay languages).

Notes

Further reading
 Gunter Minker, Herrmann Amborn, Hans-Jürgen Sasse: Das Dullay:  Materialien zu einer ostkuschitischen Sprachgruppe, Dietrich Reimer Verlag, Berlin 1980,  (German)
 Mauro Tosco: Gawwada Morphology, in: Alan S. Kaye (ed.): Morphologies of Asia and Africa, 2007, 

East Cushitic languages
Languages of Ethiopia